The Archdeacon of Brecon is a senior ecclesiastical officer in the Church in Wales Diocese of Swansea and Brecon. The archdeacon is the senior priest with responsibility over the area of the archdeaconry of Brecon, which comprises the five rural deaneries of Brecon, Builth, Crickhowell, Hay and Maelienydd.

History
The first recorded archdeacons of Brecon occur soon after the Norman Conquest in the Diocese of St David's, based in a fortified palace at Llan-ddew. However, no territorial titles are recorded until after . Following the disestablishment of the Church in Wales in 1920, the Archdeaconry of Brecon was separated from St David's diocese in 1923 to become the new Diocese of Swansea and Brecon, and subdivided into the present two archdeaconries of Brecon (redefined) and Gower.

List of archdeacons of Brecon
 1115–1120 Elias
 1120–1148 Jordan
 1174–1176 Gerald of Wales (de Barri)
 1203–1208 Gerald de Barri (the younger)
 1253 John
 1259 Roger of Christchurch
 1274 John de Fecham
 1274 Henry de Villa Amlof
 1278–1303 Adam Bareth
 1328 Philip ap Hywel
 1345, 1366 Gruffudd ap Rhys
 1389–1408 Morgan ab Einion
 1408 Richard Gyldesford
 1408–? Roger Stafford
 1437–1456 David Chirbury (previously Bishop of Dromore, 1431)
 1504–1523 William Walter
 1523–1534 Richard Fetherston (hung, drawn and quartered for papacy, 1540)
 1534-1544 Richard Gwent
 1554–1559 John Blaxton
 1559–1560 George Constantine
 1560–? William Downham
 1567-? William Blethyn (died 1590; also Bishop of Llandaff, 1575)
 1578-1620 Andrew Phillips
 1620  Isaac Singleton
 1643–1671 William Nicholson (also Bishop of Gloucester, 1660)
 1671–1704 Timothy Halton (also Archdeacon of Oxford, 1675)
 ?1704–1708 Roger Griffith
 1708–1736 Joseph Stephens
  Richard Davies
 1736–1759 Thomas Payn
 1759–1763 Thomas Eynon
 1763–1805 Edward Edwards
 1805–1859 Richard Davies (the younger)
 1859–1875 Richard William Davies
 1875–1895 Henry de Winton
 1895–1907 (ret.): William Bevan (father of Edward)
 1907–1923 (res.): Edward Bevan (afterwards Suffragan Bishop of Swansea, 1915)
1923: Archdeaconry redefined as part of the Diocese of Swansea and Brecon
 1923–1939 (ret.): Henry Church Jones
 1939–1947 (ret.): Henry Stewart
 1947–1955: Richard Cole-Hamilton
 1955–1969 (ret.): William Wilkinson
 1969–1978 (ret.): Thomas Griffiths
 1979–1987 (res.): Owain Jones (afterwards Archdeacon of Gower, 1987)
 1987–1994 (ret.): Wynford Rees
 1994–1999 (res.): Brian James 
 1999–2003 (ret.): Elwyn John
 2003–2013 (ret.): Randolph Thomas
 2013–present: Alan Jevons

References

Brecon